Dennis Bock (born August 28, 1964) is a Canadian novelist and short story writer, lecturer at the University of Toronto, travel writer and book reviewer. His novel Going Home Again was published in Canada by HarperCollins and in the US by Alfred A. Knopf in August 2013. It was shortlisted for the 2013 Scotiabank Giller Prize.

Going Home Again earned a review in Kirkus Review.

The Communist's Daughter, published by HarperCollins in Canada and Knopf in the US in 2006, and later in France, the Netherlands, Greece and Poland, is a retelling of the final years in the life of the Canadian surgeon Norman Bethune. 

His first novel, The Ash Garden, about various kinds of fallout from the Hiroshima bomb, was published in 2001, and was shortlisted for the Books in Canada First Novel Award and the International Dublin Literary Award, the Kiriyama Pacific Rim Prize, and the Commonwealth Writers' Prize (Regional Best Book). It won the 2002 Canada-Japan Literary Award and has been published in translation in Spain, Argentina, Japan, the Netherlands, Italy, Germany, France and Greece. Bock was reviewed in The Los Angeles Times and The New York Times (by Michiko Kakutani). His editor at Knopf, starting with The Ash Garden, is Gary Fisketjon.

After serving as fiction editor at the literary journal Blood & Aphorisms and holding writing residences at Yaddo, the Banff Centre, and Fundacion Valparaiso, in Spain, Bock published his first book, a short story collection Olympia, in 1998, for which he won the Danuta Gleed Literary Award for the best debut short story collection in Canada, the Canadian Authors' Association Jubilee Award, and the Betty Trask Award in the UK.

His short stories have appeared in Glimmer Train, The Penguin Book of Canadian Short Stories, The Journey Prize Anthology, and Coming Attractions. His travel writing and book reviews appear in The Globe and Mail, The National Post, The Washington Post, and Outpost Magazine.

Personal life
Dennis Bock was born August 28, 1964 in Belleville, Ontario. He studied English literature and philosophy at the University of Western Ontario, and took one year off during that time to live in Spain. After completing his degree he returned to Madrid, Spain, where he lived for 4 years. It was there he finished writing Olympia. Bock lives in Toronto and has two sons. He teaches at the University of Toronto and is on faculty at Humber College's School for Writers.

Prizes and honours

Bibliography

Novels
 The Ash Garden (2001)
 The Communist's Daughter (2006)
 Going Home Again (2013)

Short stories
 Olympia (1998)

References

External links
 Official site
 Interview with Dennis Bock, Quill & Quire, August 2001
 New York Times review of The Communist's Daughter, March 4, 2007
 New York Times review of Going Home Again, August 30, 2013

Canadian male novelists
Canadian male short story writers
Living people
1964 births
University of Western Ontario alumni
20th-century Canadian novelists
21st-century Canadian novelists
20th-century Canadian short story writers
21st-century Canadian short story writers
20th-century Canadian male writers
21st-century Canadian male writers